The anime television series Vinland Saga is based on the manga series of the same name written and illustrated by Makoto Yukimura. Twin Engine announced on March 19, 2018, that the series would receive an anime television series adaptation animated by Wit Studio. The series is directed by Shūhei Yabuta, with Hiroshi Seko handling series composition, Takahiko Abiru designing the characters and Yutaka Yamada composing the music. The series focuses on Thorfinn, the young Iceland villager who aims to participate in wars like his retired father, Thors.

The anime aired from July 7, 2019, with the first three episodes, and finished on December 29, 2019.  The series ran for 24 episodes on NHK General TV. Amazon streams the series in North America and Australia on their Prime Video service. Due to the pending arrival of Typhoon Faxai on September 8, 2019, Episode 10 was delayed due to broadcasting news, and resumed on September 15, 2019. Due to the airing of the World Para Athletics Championship sports tournament on NHK, Episode 18 was delayed and resumed on November 17, 2019. The first opening theme is "MUKANJYO." by Survive Said The Prophet while the first ending theme is "Torches" by Aimer. The second opening theme is "Dark Crow" by Man with a Mission and the second ending theme is "Drown" by milet.

On July 7, 2021, Twin Engine announced that a second season was in production. Shūhei Yabuta returned as director, and Takahiko Abiru returned as character designer. On May 5, 2022, it was announced that MAPPA will be taking over for the second season of the series. It premiered on January 10, 2023, on Tokyo MX, BS11, and GBS. The season will run for 24 episodes. The opening theme is "River" by Anonymouz, while the ending theme is "Without Love" by LMYK.

Series overview

Episode list

Season 1 (2019)

Season 2 (2023)

Home media release

Japanese

English

Notes

References

External links
  
  
 

Vinland Saga